Mohamed Burhan (born 1903, date of death unknown) was a Turkish sprinter. He competed in the men's 200 metres at the 1924 Summer Olympics.

References

External links
 

1903 births
Year of death missing
Athletes (track and field) at the 1924 Summer Olympics
Turkish male sprinters
Olympic athletes of Turkey
Place of birth missing
20th-century Turkish people